Victim of Love is the thirteenth studio album by English musician Elton John. It is a disco album, released in 1979 shortly after the peak of disco's popularity. It was not critically or commercially well-received, and is John's third lowest charting album to date in the US, after 1986's Leather Jackets and 1985's Ice on Fire.

The title track of the album, however, was moderately successful as a single. It reached No. 31 on the US Billboard Hot 100, No. 38 in Australia and No. 46 in Canada. It also peaked at No. 11 on the Canadian Adult Contemporary chart. In addition, all the tracks on the album reached No. 55 on the US Billboard Disco Top 100 chart.

Apart from an appearance on the Australian television series Countdown (he was also a comedy regular on the show during the 1980s), John did little marketing for Victim of Love. He did not tour to promote the album.

Background
At under 36 minutes, the album is the shortest of Elton John's career, and is atypical of his recording career in several respects. He neither wrote the songs nor played piano or keyboards, only providing the vocals. It was his first album without any of his original band members, which would not happen again until his 2010 collaboration with Leon Russell, The Union. , it is also one of only two studio albums (along with A Single Man) without contributions from lyricist Bernie Taupin. 

"Strangers", the B-side of the single of the album's title track, appeared as a bonus track on the 1998 Mercury reissue of John's previous album, A Single Man, because it was recorded during those sessions.

When the album was released as a CD in the 1980s, the track breaks were incorrect. The first 45 seconds of "Spotlight" was part of the previous track, and similar errors occurred in other tracks. In 2003, the album was reissued in a digitally remastered format, with those problems corrected.

Critical reception
The album was panned by critics. In ranking all of John's studio albums, Matt Springer of Ultimate Classic Rock placed the album at the bottom of the list. The Rolling Stone Album Guide called it the "nadir" of John's recorded output.

Aside from the title track appearing on the deluxe edition of the Diamonds compilation, none of the album’s songs appear on any of John’s numerous greatest hits releases.

Track listing

Side one
 "Johnny B. Goode" (Chuck Berry) – 8:06
 "Warm Love in a Cold World" (Pete Bellotte, Stefan Wisnet, Gunther Moll) – 4:30 (3:22 on older pressings)
 "Born Bad" (Bellotte, Geoff Bastow) – 5:16 (6:20 on older pressings)

Side two
 "Thunder in the Night" (Bellotte, Michael Hofmann) – 4:40
 "Spotlight" (Bellotte, Wisnet, Moll) – 4:24
 "Street Boogie" (Bellotte, Wisnet, Moll) – 3:56
 "Victim of Love" (Bellotte, Sylvester Levay, Jerry Rix) – 4:52 (5:02 on older pressings)

Personnel 
 Elton John – lead and backing vocals
 Thor Baldursson – keyboards, arrangements
 Roy Davies – keyboards
 Craig Snyder – lead guitar
 Tim Cansfield – rhythm guitar
 Steve Lukather – guitar solo on "Warm Love in a Cold World" and "Born Bad"
 Marcus Miller – bass guitar
 Keith Forsey – drums
 Paulinho da Costa – percussion
 Lenny Pickett – saxophone on "Johnny B. Goode"
 Michael McDonald – backing vocals on "Victim of Love"
 Patrick Simmons – backing vocals on "Victim of Love"
 Stephanie Spruill – backing vocals
 Julia Tillman Waters – backing vocals
 Maxine Willard Waters – backing vocals

Production 
 Produced by Pete Bellotte
 Engineer and Mixdown – Peter Luedmann
 Assistant Engineers – Hans Menzel and Carolyn Tapp
 Technical Engineer – Roman Olearczuk
 Recorded at Musicland, Munich and Rusk Sound Studios, Hollywood.
 Mastered by Brian Gardner at Allen Zentz Mastering (Hollywood).
 Music Contractor – Trevor Veitch
 Production Coordination – Jerry Simpson
 Project Coordination – Joe Black
 Photography – David P. Bailey
 Design – Jubilee Graphics

Charts

Certifications and sales

References

External links

Disco albums by English artists
Elton John albums
1979 albums
The Rocket Record Company albums
Albums produced by Pete Bellotte